A pütchipü'ü, or pütche'ejachi (in Wayuu, "messenger of the word"), is the central element in the traditional administration justice system of the Wayuu people. The role of a pütchipü'ü is to solve conflicts through mediation and negotiation. This can include conflicts between different members or clans of the Wayuu community or with people or organizations outside the Wayuu people. This negotiation includes material compensation to be paid by the aggravating family to the aggrieved family group.

In 2010, this mediation system was recognized by UNESCO as part of the Intangible Cultural Heritage of Humanity. This indigenous law system has been recognized by governments of Venezuela and Colombia. The pütchipü'ui are organized by the Major Autonomous Board of Palabreros.

See also
 Masterpieces of the Oral and Intangible Heritage of Humanity
 UNESCO Intangible Cultural Heritage Lists

References

Wayuu
Masterpieces of the Oral and Intangible Heritage of Humanity
Traditional knowledge